Len Steckler (May 6, 1928 – August 11, 2016) was an American photographer, illustrator, and filmmaker.  Steckler was known for the artistry behind many famous ad campaigns, including Pepsi Cola's "Refreshes Without Filling" illustrations in the 1950s, Noxzema's "Take it off — Take it all off" television commercials in the early 1970s, and an ad featuring Joe Namath in Hanes pantyhose.  In 2010, he received widespread attention for the release of a previously unknown series of photographs, entitled Marilyn Monroe: The Visit, which offered a candid glimpse of a 1961 encounter between Monroe and famed poet Carl Sandburg.

Steckler began his artistic career with painting. The youngest member of New York's Society of Illustrators, he painted illustrations for short and serialized stories that appeared in leading magazines of the day.  As photography gradually replaced illustration, however, Steckler segued to a full-time career as a photographer.

With major clients such as Pepsi Cola, Max Factor, Revlon, and Helena Rubinstein, Steckler's work was featured in magazines such as Ladies' Home Journal, McCall's, Playboy, and Look, and made the cover of publications such as Good Housekeeping (1962–66), The Saturday Evening Post (1962–66), Popular Photography (1961–68), and Camera (1968–71).

Celebrities
Among Steckler's subjects were some of the most famous personalities in the world, including:
 Marilyn Monroe
 Carl Sandburg
 John Wayne
 Joe Namath
 Andrés Segovia
 Joanne Woodward
 Julie Newmar

Models
Often working with hi-end models of the time, Steckler became known for his shots of beautiful women.  A much abbreviated list:
 Suzy Parker
 Tippi Hedren
 Cheryl Tiegs
 Jennifer O'Neill
 Erin Gray

Television Commercials
For the next phase of his career, Steckler turned to directing television commercials.  He made an impact on the medium with innovations such as solarization, extreme slow-motion and the use of subliminal imagery.  Perhaps his most well known TV ad came in 1974, when he put NFL quarterback Joe Namath in pantyhose for a Hanes Beauty Mist commercial.  Steckler won many awards for his commercial work, including numerous Clio awards, the Silver Lion (Leone d'Argento) of the Venice Film Festival (1970) and from such institutions as the Art Directors Club, the American Institute of Graphic Arts (AIGA), and The Chicago 4 Awards.  A number of his commercials have been included in the collection of the Museum of Television and Radio.  Some of his prominent clients have included:
 United Airlines
 Yves Saint Laurent
 Johnson & Johnson
 Miller Brewing Company
 AT&T
 Parfums Givenchy
 Noxell Corporation (Noxzema, Cover Girl)
 Woolite
 Colgate-Palmolive
 Progresso
 Ivory Soap
 Hanes
 Celanese Corporation
 Wamsutta
 Serta

Film
In 1974, Steckler directed and filmed the live-action sequences for the Emmy award-winning television special, Free to Be... You and Me.  Upon moving to Los Angeles in 1976, Steckler began directing and producing movies for television, including “Mad Bull” (1977), “Rodeo Girl” (1980), “The Demon Murders” (1983), and  “Mercy or Murder” (1987),.

Steckler is a collected and exhibited artist and photographer.

In 2005, Steckler lost his left eye to cancer.

In late 2009, Steckler's son came upon a set of long-forgotten photographs that Len Steckler had taken of Marilyn Monroe meeting with Carl Sandburg eight months before her death.  The series of photographs, entitled "The Visit" was made available to the public in limited quantities. As a result of this discovery, and of their subsequent release to the public, Len Steckler appeared on the “Today Show” (February, 2010) and was interviewed by Meredith Vieira about that day in December 1961.

References

External links
Len Steckler Official Website

The Visit Series of candids of Marilyn Monroe and Carl Sandburg
Interview on The Today Show
Blog post on Len Steckler illustration
Blog post on Steckler photo

1928 births
2016 deaths
American photographers
20th-century American painters
American male painters
21st-century American painters
American cinematographers
Film producers from New York (state)
People from Brooklyn
Painters from New York City
Film directors from New York City
20th-century American male artists